Guy Wetmore Carryl (4 March 1873 – 1 April 1904) was an American humorist and poet.

Biography

Carryl was born in New York City, the first-born of writer Charles Edward Carryl and Mary R. Wetmore.

He had his first article published in The New York Times when he was 20 years old. In 1895, at the age of 22, Carryl graduated from Columbia University. During his college years he had written plays for amateur performances, including the very first Varsity Show. One of his professors was Harry Thurston Peck, who was scandalized by Carryl's famous statement, "It takes two bodies to make one seduction", which was somewhat risqué for those times.

After graduation, in 1896 he became a staff writer for Munsey's Magazine under Frank Munsey and he was later promoted to managing editor of the magazine. Later he went to work for Harper's Magazine and was sent to Paris. While in Paris he wrote for Life, Outing, 
Munsey's, and Collier's, as well as his own independent writings.

Some of Carryl's better-known works were his humorous poems that were parodies of Aesop's Fables, such as "The Sycophantic Fox and the Gullible Raven" and of Mother Goose nursery rhymes, such as "The Embarrassing Episode of Little Miss Muffet", poems which are still popular today. He also wrote a number of humorous parodies of Grimm's Fairy Tales, such as "How Little Red Riding Hood Came To Be Eaten" and "How Fair Cinderella Disposed of Her Shoe". His humorous poems usually ended with a pun on the words used in the moral of the story.

You are only absurd when you get in the curd,
But you’re rude when you get in the whey.
—from “The Embarrassing Episode of Little Miss Muffet”

Guy Carryl died in 1904 at age 31 at Roosevelt Hospital in New York City. His death was thought to be a result of illness contracted from exposure while fighting a fire at his house a month earlier.

Works 

 The Buccaneer, Operetta in Two Acts (1895) – libretto by Carryl, music by Kenneth M. Murchison, Jr., 
 Fables for the Frivolous (with Apologies to La Fontaine) (1898), illustrated by Peter Newell – based on fables by Jean de La Fontaine
 Mother Goose for Grown-Ups (1900), illus. Newell and Gustave Verbeek
 Grimm Tales Made Gay (1902), illus. Albert Levering
The Lieutenant Governor (1903)
Zut and Other Parisians (1903)
The Transgression of Andrew Vane (1904)
 Far from the Maddening Girls (1904) – posthumous
The Garden of Years (1904) – posthumous

Sources 
Columbia University biography

External links 

 
 
 
 
Fun with Guy Wetmore Carryl – A collection of Carryl’s humorous poems
The Wondering Minstrels – Collection of poetry from Rice University
Guy Wetmore Carryl poetry from Poetry Archive
“Marvelous Coney Island”, a 1901 article by Carryl in Munsey’s
Grimm Tales Made Gay
A picture of the cast of a play at Columbia University, written by Carryl (PDF)
 

1873 births
1904 deaths
American humorists
American humorous poets
American male poets
Writers from New York City
Columbia College (New York) alumni
American magazine editors
19th-century American poets
19th-century American male writers
Poets from New York (state)
20th-century American poets
American parodists
American magazine writers
20th-century American male writers